Shared Experience is a British theatre company. Its current joint artistic directors are Nancy Meckler and Polly Teale. Kate Saxon is an Associate Director.

Productions
A Passage to India (2003)
Madame Bovary
After Mrs Rochester, by Polly Teale, on the life of Jean Rhys (2003)
The Clearing
The Magic Toyshop
The Mill on the Floss
A Doll's House
Anna Karenina
Gone to Earth
A Passage to India
Jane Eyre (2006)
Brontë (2005/11)
Orestes
Kindertransport (2007)
War and Peace adapted by Helen Edmundson (2008)
Mine (2008)
The Caucasian Chalk Circle (2009)
The Glass Menagerie (2010)
Speechless (2011)
Mary Shelley (2012)
Bracken Moor (2013)
As You Like It (2017)

References

External links
Shared Experience website
https://archive.today/20130914170855/http://www.share-your-experiences.com/
The Shared Experience Theatre Company archive is held by the Victoria and Albert Museum Theatre and Performance Department.

Theatre companies in England